= Laws and regulations for electronic payment in Mauritius =

Laws and Regulations for Electronic Payment in Mauritius

The Electronic Transactions Act (ETA).
